Scopula undulataria is a moth of the  family Geometridae. It is found in India (Darjeeling).

References

Moths described in 1888
undulataria
Moths of Asia